The 2009 North Texas Mean Green football team represented the University of North Texas in the 2009 NCAA Division I FBS football season. The 2009 season was the team's third under head coach Todd Dodge. The Mean Green played their home games on campus at Fouts Field in Denton, Texas. North Texas finished the season 2–10 and 1–7 in Sun Belt play.

Schedule

Schedule from

Game summaries

Ball State
Overall: (0–0), Conference: (0–0)

1st Quarter
 09:24 UNT- Lance Dunbar 3 Yd Run (Jeremy Knot Kick) 7–0

2nd Quarter

 01:19 UNT- Jeremy Knot 24 Yd FG 10–0

3rd Quarter
 06:19 BALL- Ian McGarvey 21 Yd FG 10–3

4th Quarter
 12:41 BALL- MiQuale Lewis 27 Yd Run (Ian Mcgarvey Kick) 10–10
 10:46 UNT- Michael Outlaw 4 Yd Pass from Riley Dodge (Jeremy Knott Kick) 17–10 
 07:36 UNT- Jeremy Knott 19 Yd FG 20–10

Ohio
Overall: (0–1), Conference: (0–0)

1st Quarter
 01:07 UNT- Jeremy Knott 32 Yd FG 0–3

2nd Quarter
 12:25 UNT- Cam Montgomery 4 Yd Run (Jeremy Knott Kick) 0–10 
 00:06 OHIO- Matt Weller 44 Yd FG 3–10

3rd Quarter
 13:21 OHIO- Matt Weller 47 yd fg 6–10
 08:43 UNT- Jamaal Jackson 16 Yd Pass From Riley Dodge (Jeremy Knott Kick) 6–17
 02:52 OHIO- Riley Dunlop 32 Yd Pass From Theo Scott (Matt Weller Kick) 13–17

4th Quarter
 08:44 OHIO- Kenny Jackson 69 Yd Interception Return (Matt Weller Kick) 20–17
 00:46 UNT- Jeremy Knott 18 Yd FG 20–20

1st Overtime
 OHIO- Matt Weller 35 Yd 23–20
 UNT- Jeremy Knott 22 Yd 23–23

2nd Overtime
 UNT- Cam Montgomery 7 Yd Run (Jeremy Knott Kick) 23–30
 OHIO- Taylor Price 15 Yd Pass From Theo Scott (Theo Scott Pass To Taylor Price For Two-Point Conversion) 31–30

Alabama
Overall: (2–0), Conference: (0–0)

1st Quarter
 07:47 ALA- Greg McElroy 2 Yd Run (Leigh Tiffin Kick) 0–7
 02:52 ALA- Marquis Maze 34 Yd Pass From Greg McElroy (Leigh Tiffin Kick) 0–14

2nd Quarter
 11:56 ALA- Trent Richardson 1 Yd Run (Leigh Tiffin Kick) 0–21
 03:56 ALA- Mark Ingram 29 Yd Pass From Greg McElroy (Pat Failed) 0–27
 00:00 ALA- Leigh Tiffin 35 Yd FG 0–30

3rd Quarter
 12:26 ALA- Mark Ingram 5 Yd Run (Leigh Tiffin Kick) 0–37
 04:29 ALA- Terry Grant 1 Yd Run (Leigh Tiffin Kick) 0–44
 02:11 UNT- Lance Dunbar 34 Yd Pass From Nathan Tune (Jeremy Knott Kick) 7–44

4th Quarter
 11:42 ALA- Leigh Tiffin 20 Yd FG 7–47
 05:59 ALA- Terry Grant 9 Yd Run (Pat Failed) 7–53

Middle Tennessee
Overall: (2–1), Conference: (0–0)

1st Quarter
 11:38 MTSU- Benjamin Cunningham 50 Yd Pass From Dwight Dasher (Alan Gendreau Kick) 7–0
 09:17 MTSU- Alan Gendreau 20 Yd FG 10–0
 01:47 UNT- Lance Dunbar 66 Yd Run (Jeremy Knott Kick) 10–7

2nd Quarter
 14:04 MTSU- Alan Gendreau 31 Yd FG 13–7
 11:55 MTSU- Dwight Dasher 6 Yd Run (Alan Gendreau Kick) 20–7
 04:43 MTSU- Dwight Dasher 2 Yd Run (Alan Gendreau Kick) 27–7
 00:22 MTSU- Alan Gendreau 48 Yd FG 30–7

3rd Quarter
 07:49 UNT- Riley Dodge 4 Yd Run (Jeremy Knott Kick) 30–14
 00:02 UNT- Lance Dunbar 18 Yd Run (Jeremy Knott Kick) 30–21

4th Quarter
 10:54 MTSU- Desmond Gee 24 Yd Pass From Dwight Dasher (Alan Gendreau Kick) 37–21

Louisiana-Lafayette
Overall: (2–2), Conference: (0–0) 

1st Quarter
 08:10 UNT- Jeremy Knott 41 Yd FG 3–0
 00:37 ULL- Dwight Bentley 70 Yd Interception Return (Tyler Albrecht Kick) 3–7

2nd Quarter
 13:57 ULL- Tyler Albrecht 45 Yd FG 3–10
 09:42 UNT- Lance Dunbar 1 Yd Run (Jeremy Knott Kick) 10–10
 06:14 ULL- Chris Masson 25 Yd Run (Tyler Albrecht Kick) 10–17
 04:41 ULL- Andrew Joseph 33 Yd Return Of Blocked Punt (Tyler Albrecht Kick) 10–24
 03:48 UNT- Lance Dunbar 37 Yd Run (Jeremy Knott Kick) 17–24
 00:37 UNT- Lance Dunbar 1 Yd Run (Jeremy Knott Kick) 24–24

3rd Quarter
 10:39 UNT- Jeremy Knott 27 Yd FG 27–24
 03:51 UNT- Lance Dunbar 1 Yd Run (Jeremy Knott Kick) 34–24

4th Quarter
 09:26 ULL- Brad McGuire 1 Yd Run (Tyler Albrecht Kick) 34–31
 00:27 ULL- Marlin Miller 4 Yd Pass From Chris Masson (Tyler Albrecht Kick) 34–38

Florida Atlantic
Overall: (0–4), Conference: (0–0)

Troy
Overall: (3–0), Conference: (4–2)

Western Kentucky
Overall: (0–7), Conference: (0–3)

Louisiana-Monroe
Overall: (4–4), Conference: (3–1)

Florida International
Overall: (2–7), Conference: (2–4)

Army
Overall: (4–6)

Arkansas State
Overall: (2–8), Conference: (1–5)

References

North Texas
North Texas Mean Green football seasons
North Texas Mean Green football